Eleazer Kingsbury Foster, Jr. (October 31, 1841 – December 8, 1899) was an American lawyer, state attorney, Superintendent of Florida Schools from 1881 until 1884, and judge.

He was born in Connecticut, one of the sons of Eleazer Kingsbury Foster. He studied at the Collegiate and Commercial Institute of New Haven and graduated from Yale University in 1863. After being admitted to the Connecticut Bar in 1865 he moved to Florida for health reasons in 1866. In 1867 Eleazer K. Foster Jr. registered to vote in Saint Johns County.

He was appointed as State Superintendent of Public Instruction in 1881 by Florida governor William D. Bloxham. He served until 1884.

He represented Henry Sanford, including in land purchases, and worked as a lawyer in Sanford, Florida. A tribute was paid to him in the Alachua County court system upon news of his death.

See also
Florida Department of Education

References

1841 births
1899 deaths
Florida lawyers
Connecticut lawyers
Yale University alumni
People from Sanford, Florida
Education in Florida
19th-century American lawyers